The Women's 1500 metres at the 2011 World Championships in Athletics was held at the Daegu Stadium on August 28 & 30, and September 1.

Maryam Yusuf Jamal of Bahrain, the gold medallist in 2009, had the two fastest times of the year prior to the competition. American Morgan Uceny entered as the Diamond League leader and her compatriot Shannon Rowbury (bronze in 2009) was also present. The 2010 World Indoor champion Kalkidan Gezahegne, Russia's Ekaterina Gorbunova and Btissam Lakhouad of Morocco completed the top four fastest runners that year. Other prominent entrants included 2008 Olympic champion Nancy Jebet Langat, 2009 runner-up Lisa Dobriskey and world indoor medallists Natalia Rodríguez and Gelete Burka.

The final was a tight pack, disrupted in the turn less than a lap and a half before the finish when Hellen Onsando Obiri fell taking out Uceny along with her.  With a pack of 9 remaining, the competitors jockeyed for position on the final lap.  As they entered the final straightaway Natalia Rodríguez had a slight edge on the pack almost four wide.  Jennifer Barringer Simpson and Hannah England were trailing the pack but Simpson went wide and passed the field as Rodríguez started to falter.  England followed Simpson in full sprint across the finish line.

Nataliya Tobias was disqualified for doping in 2012 after further analysis of a sample of hers from the Daegu Championships. Olesya Syreva, Anzhela Shevchenko and Natallia Kareiva have later had their results disqualified after they were found to be doping based on abnormalities in their biological passport profiles.

Records
Prior to the competition, the records were as follows:

Qualification standards

Schedule

Results

Heats
Qualification: First 6 in each heat (Q) and the next 6 fastest (q) advance to the semifinals.

Following a protest lodged by the Ethiopian federation, due to a crash by New Zealand's Nikki Hamblin who caused Gezahegne to stagger onto the infield.

Semifinals
Qualification: First 5 in each heat (Q) and the next 2 fastest (q) advance to the final.

Final

References

External links
1500 metres results at IAAF website

1500
1500 metres at the World Athletics Championships
2011 in women's athletics